Blue Sky Blue is the fifth studio album by Australian rock musician Pete Murray. The album peaked at number 6 on the ARIA Charts and was certified gold.

Reception

Jon O'Brien from AllMusic said "Eschewing the idea that the breakup album always has to be a tortured affair, Brisbane vocalist/guitarist Pete Murray's album, Blue Sky Blue, recorded after the split with his wife of three years, is a surprisingly buoyant and harmonious effort that opts for reason rather than regret or revenge" calling the album one that "...should further Murray's reputation as one of Australia's most charming singer/songwriters."

Track listing

Charts

Weekly charts

Year-end charts

Certifications

References

2011 albums
Pete Murray (Australian singer-songwriter) albums